George Williamson Smith (born November 21, 1836, in Catskill, New York) was an Episcopal Priest, Navy Chaplain, and the president of Trinity College in Hartford, Connecticut from 1883 to 1904.

References

1836 births
People from Catskill, New York
Place of death missing
Presidents of Trinity College (Connecticut)
American Episcopal priests
United States Navy chaplains